The coat of arms of Bashkortostan is a national symbol of the Republic of Bashkortostan, Russia.

Description

It features the monument to Salavat Yulaev in Ufa against the rising of the sun and its rays, inscribed in the circle framed with the national ornament. Below shows the inflorescence of the Bashkor rose (Pleurospermum uralense), painted in the colors of the national flag of Bashkortostan, with an inscription of the name "Bashkortostan" on white.

Gallery

See also
Flag of the Republic of Bashkortostan

References

Bashkortostan
Bashkortostan
Bashkortostan
Bashkortostan
Bashkortostan